Edgar Tur (born 28 December 1996) is an Estonian professional footballer who plays as a right back for Paide Linnameeskond.

International career
He represented Estonia at U21 level.

He made his national team debut on 7 October 2020 in a friendly against Lithuania.

References

External links

1996 births
Living people
Estonian footballers
Association football defenders
Esiliiga players
Meistriliiga players
First Professional Football League (Bulgaria) players
FCI Tallinn players
Paide Linnameeskond players
FC Botev Vratsa players
Footballers from Tallinn
Estonia international footballers
Estonia under-21 international footballers
Estonian expatriate footballers
Expatriate footballers in Bulgaria
Estonian expatriate sportspeople in Bulgaria